Joseph Ngwenya (born March 30, 1981, in Plumtree) is a Zimbabwean footballer.

Career

College
Ngwenya attended the Mzilikazi High School in Bulawayo, leading them to the 1999 Zimbabwe National High School Championship, before moving to the United States in 2000 to attend and play college soccer at Coastal Carolina University. He led the NCAA in scoring with 21 goals and 14 assists and was named a First Team All-American in 2003.

During his college years he also played in the USL Premier Development League for Cape Cod Crusaders who he led to a PDL title, scoring with 17 goals in 13 games.

Professional
Ngwenya was drafted third overall of the 2004 MLS SuperDraft by Los Angeles Galaxy of Major League Soccer. In his first year with the Galaxy, he played at both forward and midfield and finished the year with four goals in 22 games, most of them coming off the bench. In his second year, he was bothered by injury did not score a goal or an assist. Ngwenya was involved in a 4-person trade on May 12, 2006, which sent him to the Crew, for whom he would play 20 games and score five goals in 2006.

In the period following the 2006 season, Ngwenya went on trial at Getafe in the Spanish first division, but failed to earn a contract. He was traded to Houston Dynamo during the 2007 season for Alejandro Moreno. Ngwenya scored the game tying goal in the 2007 MLS Cup Final which Houston won 2–1 at RFK Stadium.

Following the 2007 MLS season, Ngwenya joined German second division team Alemannia Aachen for an opportunity to train and tryout with the Bundesliga club.

On January 21, 2008, Ngwenya was signed by Austrian Bundesliga club SK Austria Kärnten. After Kärnten dissolved his contract in summer 2008 he gained the chance to train with the first squad of FC Bayern Munich for three weeks. On July 23, 2008, Ngwenya appeared in the unofficial T-Home German Supercup for Bayern Munich against Borussia Dortmund.

After going almost a year without a club on April 6, 2010, Houston Dynamo announced that Ngwenya would be evaluated on a one-week basis for consideration of a return to the team. The Dynamo recognized the need for help at the forward position after Brian Ching sustained a hamstring injury in their home opener against Real Salt Lake. He agreed terms with Houston on April 12, 2010.

Ngwenya remained with Houston for the 2010 season but was not tendered a contract for 2011.  He entered the 2010 MLS Re-Entry Draft and was selected by D.C. United with the first pick.

He spent the 2011 season with D.C. United, scoring zero goals in 16 games. At season's end, the club declined his 2012 contract option and he entered the 2011 MLS Re-Entry Draft. Ngwenya was not selected in the draft and became a free agent.

Ngwenya signed with USL Pro club Richmond Kickers on April 11, 2013.

It was announced on November 5, 2013, that Ngwenya has signed a contract with USL Pro club the Pittsburgh Riverhounds for the 2014 season.

International
Ngwenya was named in Zimbabwe's squad for the 2010 World Cup Qualifiers, and started against Guinea and his first home game against Namibia.

Honors

Cape Cod Crusaders
 USL Premier Development League Champions: 2003

Los Angeles Galaxy
 Lamar Hunt U.S. Open Cup: 2005
 Major League Soccer MLS Cup: 2005
 Major League Soccer Western Conference Championship: 2005

Houston Dynamo
 Major League Soccer MLS Cup: 2007
 Major League Soccer Western Conference Championship: 2007

References

External links

 
 Coastal Carolina bio
 

1981 births
Living people
Zimbabwean footballers
Zimbabwe international footballers
Coastal Carolina Chanticleers men's soccer players
Cape Cod Crusaders players
LA Galaxy players
Columbus Crew players
Houston Dynamo FC players
SK Austria Kärnten players
D.C. United players
Richmond Kickers players
Pittsburgh Riverhounds SC players
Austrian Football Bundesliga players
Antalyaspor footballers
Expatriate soccer players in the United States
Expatriate footballers in Turkey
Expatriate footballers in Austria
Zimbabwean expatriate footballers
LA Galaxy draft picks
USL League Two players
Major League Soccer players
Süper Lig players
USL Championship players
Zimbabwean expatriate sportspeople in Austria
Zimbabwean expatriate sportspeople in Turkey
Zimbabwean expatriate sportspeople in the United States
Association football forwards
All-American men's college soccer players
Alumni of Mzilikazi High School